Ausma Kantāne-Ziedone (10 November 1941 – 29 May 2022) was a Latvian actress and politician.

She was the widow of late poet Imants Ziedonis.

References

External links 
 

1941 births
2022 deaths
Politicians from Riga
Actors from Riga
New Era Party politicians
Deputies of the 8th Saeima
Deputies of the 9th Saeima
Soviet actresses
20th-century Latvian actresses
21st-century Latvian women politicians
Riga State Gymnasium No.1 alumni
People's Artists of the Latvian Soviet Socialist Republic
Women deputies of the Saeima